Shrout may refer to:

Shrout, Kentucky, an unincorporated community located in Bath County
Jason Shrout, an American drummer